Jovino González, (born October 16, 1975) is a Spanish sprint canoer who competed from the mid-1990s to the early 2000s (decade). Competing in two Summer Olympics, he earned his best finish of fifth in the K-4 1000 m event at Atlanta in 1996.

References
Sports-Reference.com profile

1975 births
Canoeists at the 1996 Summer Olympics
Canoeists at the 2000 Summer Olympics
Living people
Olympic canoeists of Spain
Spanish male canoeists